Opatovac may refer to:
Opatovac, Brod-Posavina County
Opatovac, Vukovar-Syrmia County